On Parole is a studio recording released by British rock band Motörhead. It was intended as their first album and left unreleased at the time of its completion in 1976, and it was not released until over three years later, on 8 December 1979, after the commercial success of Overkill and Bomber that same year. It was released without the band's permission, and they consequently distanced themselves from it. As a result, it was not considered an official release by the band at the time and they did not want it released, as they had moved on, since then, first to Chiswick Records and then to Bronze Records.

With the addition of lead guitarist "Fast" Eddie Clarke, On Parole was re-recorded almost in its entirety in 1977 during the sessions for the album Motörhead, largely due to having very limited studio time available.

Background
On Parole is the only album to feature the band's original line-up of Lemmy on vocals and bass, Larry Wallis on guitar and vocals, and Lucas Fox on drums. Motörhead signed a deal with United Artists when manager Douglas Smith secured a deal with the label's A&R man Andrew Lauder, both men having worked together for Lemmy's previous group Hawkwind. During the sessions, original producer Dave Edmunds relinquished his duties, being replaced by Fritz Fryer. Fox left the band as recording was nearing its conclusion and was replaced by Phil "Philthy Animal" Taylor, a casual acquaintance Lemmy had met through the local "speed" scene. Taylor had been persuaded to drive him to Rockfield Studios and "bring his drum kit", as he had boasted to Lemmy that he was a drummer. Taylor was given the job and set about overdubbing all of Fox's previously recorded drum tracks with the exception of "Lost Johnny", as he was being held in jail following an arrest for alleged drunk-and-disorderly conduct when that session was due to take place.

Taylor had taken a job painting a houseboat and his foreman happened to be "Fast" Eddie Clarke. When Taylor mentioned that he had just joined Motörhead, Clarke was intrigued, having read about the band. Clarke told Taylor that he was a guitarist but didn't mention that he had recorded two albums with Curtis Knight. When Motörhead guitarist Wallis floated the idea of adding a second guitarist to the band, Taylor recommended Clarke, and the band briefly became a four-piece for the first time. Wallis' interest in the band was rapidly fading and he soon left, and Motörhead were a trio once more.

Recording
Four of the songs appearing on On Parole were recorded during a single session at Rockfield Studios in Monmouth, Wales in September 1975, while the rest were recorded in December 1975, with various overdubs laid down in January and February 1976. Initially, the band recorded several demos with producer Dave Edmunds at Rockfield, but Edmunds' commitment to the project was questionable. Lemmy later told Geoff Barton of Sounds:

The fatigue of recording with an uncommitted producer also had a deleterious effect on Larry Wallis (who left the band soon afterwards):

Of the tracks, three ("Motörhead", "The Watcher" and "Lost Johnny") were re-recordings of songs Lemmy had written and recorded with Hawkwind, "City Kids" was a re-recording of a Wallis-penned track previously recorded by The Pink Fairies, and "Leaving Here" was a cover version of a Holland-Dozier-Holland Motown song Lemmy had learned whilst a roadie for The Birds. Perhaps concluding that the Motörhead version would never see the light of day, Wallis re-recorded and released the track "On Parole" as a B-side to his Stiff Records "Police Car" single in 1977 with two members of Eddie and the Hot Rods (bassist Paul Gray and drummer Steve Nicol).

In his autobiography White Line Fever, Lemmy mentions being blown away by Taylor's ability to overdub drums during the On Parole sessions, noting that it was "quite a feat, because the drums are what you usually base a song on – it's kind of like going ass-backwards". Conversely, Lemmy also recalled the moment he realized Taylor was not a singer, noting that "he sounded like two cats being stapled together" while trying to sing "City Kids".

The lyrics to "Vibrator" and "Fools" were written by Derek "Dez" Brown, a road-crew member from Wallis' pre-Motörhead band The Pink Fairies. Brown would manage the Live Stiffs tour in 1977, which included Nick Lowe's band on the bill featuring both Wallis and Edmunds.

Release
Upon hearing the finished recordings, United Artists were not convinced of the album's commercial potential and shelved its release. Lemmy recalled his frustrations dealing with the label:

After the band's profile had risen with the commercial success of the albums Overkill and Bomber in 1979, United Artists re-appraised the album and gave it a belated release at the end of that year.  In his book Overkill: The Untold Story of Motorhead, biographer Joel McIver quotes Lemmy:

However, already in 1981 Lemmy acknowledged the album's legitimate place in the Motörhead canon, in the liner notes to the Liberty Records release:

Critical reception
Dave Thompson of AllMusic calls the arrangements on the LP "devastating, steeped in blues, drenched in booze, the highest octane pub rock of all. No matter how well you think you know Motörhead, still it's nothing like you're expecting. A true sonic symphony, this is Wagner with whiplash."

Track listing

Personnel
Per the album's liner notes.

Motörhead
 Lemmy Kilmister – lead vocals, bass
 Larry Wallis – lead guitar, backing vocals, lead vocals on "Vibrator" and "Fools"
 Phil "Philthy Animal" Taylor – drums
 Lucas Fox – drums on "Lost Johnny" and bonus tracks 10–13

Production
Dave Edmunds – producer (tracks 10–13), engineer
Motörhead – co-producers (track 10)
Fritz Fryer – producer (tracks 1–9), engineer, mastering (on original)
Terry Burch – mastering (1997 remaster)
Paul Hicks – mixing (tracks 11–13 on 1997 remaster)

Release history

1979 – UK vinyl – United Artists Rockfile, LBR1004 – single white sleeve with George Bodnar black-and-white photographs of Lemmy on front and back
1981 – UK vinyl – Liberty, LN66125 – Black-and-white photograph of Lemmy, Wallis and Fox in the studio.
1982 – UK vinyl – EMI/Liberty Fame, FA3009 – single sleeve with colour photograph of Lemmy on stage.
1991 – USA CD – Cleopatra, CLEO-57212-2 – Black-and-white photograph of Lemmy, Wallis and Fox in studio.
1997 – UK CD – EMI, 8 54794 2 – Black on white Snaggletooth logo. Sleeve notes by Mick Farren. With bonus tracks.
2000 – UK CD – EMI Gold, 8 54794 2 – Black-and-white photograph of Lemmy, Wallis and Fox in the studio. With bonus tracks.
2004 – Netherlands CD – Disky, 901611 – Black-and-white photograph of Lemmy posing. With bonus tracks.
2020 – Europe vinyl & CD – Parlophone, LBR 1004X – Same cover art as 1981 Liberty release. With bonus tracks.

Charts

References

External links
 

Motörhead albums
1979 albums
Albums produced by Dave Edmunds
United Artists Records albums
Albums recorded at Rockfield Studios